Irena Dorota Backus (1950 – 13 June 2019) was a professor of the History of the Reformation at the University of Geneva.

Life
Born in Poland in 1950, Backus studied at Somerville College, Oxford. She obtained her doctorate in 1976, with a thesis on Theodore Beza's influence on the English New Testament, published in 1980 as The Reformed Roots of the English New Testament: The Influence of Theodore Beza. From 1982 she was employed at the Institute for Reformation History in Geneva. A Festschrift in her honour was published in 2018, Crossing Traditions: Essays on the Reformation and Intellectual History in Honour of Irena Backus, edited by Maria-Cristina Pitassi and Daniela Solfaroli Camillocci with the collaboration of Arthur Huiban (Leiden, Brill).

She was obliged to stop work by a stroke in 2014, and died in Geneva on 13 June 2019.

Works
Report on the De Halpert and Corbett family papers, 1867-1936, listed by Irena Backus (London: Royal Commission on Historical Manuscripts, 1976)
Logique et Theologie au XVIe Siecle (Geneva: Université de Neuchatel, 1980)
The Reformed Roots of the English New Testament: The Influence of Theodore Beza (Pittsburgh, Pa: Pickwick Press, 1980)
Martin Borrhaus (Cellarius) (Baden-Baden: Editions Valentin Koerner, 1981)
Martini Buceri opera omnia. Series 2 Opera latina. Vol.2 Enarratio in Evangelion Johannis, edidit Irena Backus (Leiden: Brill, 1987)
Théorie et pratique de l'exégèse: actes du troisième colloque international sur l'histoire de l'exégèse biblique au 16e siècle (Genève, 31 août - 2 septembre 1988), edited by Irena Backus and Francis Higman (Geneva: Droz, 1990)
Lectures humanistes de Basile de Césarée: traductions latines (1439-1618) (Paris: Institut d'Études Augustiniennes, 1990)
The Disputations of Baden, 1526 and Berne, 1528: Neutralizing the Early Church (Princeton, N.J.: Princeton Theological Seminary, 1993)
Le miracle de Laon: le déraisonnable, le raisonnable, l'apocalyptique et le politique dans les récits du Miracle de Laon, 1566-1578 (Paris: J. Vrin, 1994)
The Reception of the Church Fathers in the West: From the Carolingians to the Maurists, edited by Irena Backus (Leiden, Brill, 1997)
Les sept visions et la fin des temps: les commentaires genevois de l'Apocalypse entre 1539 et 1584 (Geneva: Droz, 1997)
Reformation Readings of the Apocalypse: Geneva, Zurich and Wittenberg (Oxford: Oxford University Press, 2000)
Jean Calvin, Traité des reliques, edited by Irena Backus (Geneva: Labor et Fides, 2000)
Historical Method and Confessional Identity in the Era of the Reformation, 1378-1615 (Leiden: Brill, 2003)
Life Writing in Reformation Europe: Lives of Reformers by Friends, Disciples and Foes (Aldershot: Ashgate, 2008)
Calvin and his influence, 1509-2009, edited by Irena Backus and Philip Benedict (Oxford: Oxford University Press, 2011)
L'argument hérésiologique : l'Église ancienne et les Réformes, XVIe-XVIIe siècles : actes du colloque de Tours, 10-11 septembre 2010, edited by Irena Backus, Philippe Büttgen and Bernard Pouderon (Paris: Beauchesne, 2012)
"'Semipelagianism': The Origins of the Term and its Passage into the History of Heresy", Journal of Ecclesiastical History, 65:1 (2014), pp. 25–46
 Leibniz: Protestant Theologian (Oxford: Oxford University Press, 2016)

References

External links
 https://www.unige.ch/ihr/fr/equipe/professeurs-honoraires/backus/

1950 births
2019 deaths
Alumni of Somerville College, Oxford
Academic staff of the University of Geneva